Brian Gottfried and Raúl Ramírez were the defending champions but lost in the final 7–6(8-6), 6–3, 6–1 against Fred McNair and Sherwood Stewart.

Seeds

Draw

Finals

Top half

Section 1

Section 2

Bottom half

Section 3

Section 4

References

External links
1976 French Open – Men's draws and results at the International Tennis Federation
 

Men's Doubles
French Open by year – Men's doubles